Cryptocentroides is a genus of gobies native to the western Indian Ocean and the western Pacific Ocean.

Species
There are currently three recognized species in this genus:
 Cryptocentroides arabicus (J. F. Gmelin, 1789) (Arabian goby)
 Cryptocentroides gobioides (J. D. Ogilby, 1886) (Crested oystergoby)
 Cryptocentroides insignis (Seale, 1910) (Insignia prawn-goby)

References

Gobiidae
Taxa named by Canna Maria Louise Popta